In mathematics, the Pidduck polynomials sn(x) are polynomials introduced by  given by the generating function

,

See also
Umbral calculus

References

 Reprinted by Dover, 2005

Polynomials